The 2020–21 Denver Pioneers men's basketball team represented the University of Denver in the 2020–21 NCAA Division I men's basketball season. The Pioneers, led by fifth-year head coach Rodney Billups, played their home games at Hamilton Gymnasium in Denver, Colorado, as members of the Summit League. In a season limited due to the ongoing COVID-19 pandemic, the Pioneers finished the season 2–19, 1–13 in Summit League play to finish in last place. They failed to qualify for the Summit League tournament.

On March 1, 2021, the school fired Billups after five seasons as head coach. On March 29, the school named former Stanford associate head coach Jeff Wulbrun the team's new head coach.

Previous season
The Pioneers finished the 2019–20 season 7–24, 3–13 in Summit League play to finish in eighth place. They lost in the quarterfinals of the Summit League tournament to North Dakota State.

Roster

Schedule and results

|-
!colspan=12 style=| Non-conference regular season

|-
!colspan=9 style=| Summit League regular season

|-

Source

References

Denver Pioneers men's basketball seasons
Denver Pioneers
Denver Pioneers men's basketball
Denver Pioneers men's basketball